The 1922 North Carolina Tar Heels baseball team represented the University of North Carolina at Chapel Hill in the 1922 NCAA baseball season. The team posted a 19–2 record, and claimed a Southern Conference championship. The football team also claimed a title.

Schedule

References 

North Carolina Tar Heels baseball seasons
North Carolina baseball
North Carolina
Southern Conference baseball champion seasons